Sleaford Mere Conservation Park, formerly the Sleaford Mere National Park,  is a protected area in the Australian state of South Australia  located in the locality of Sleaford on the Jussieu Peninsula at the south eastern tip of Eyre Peninsula  about  south west of Port Lincoln.

The conservation park consists of Sleaford Mere, a permanent saline lake, and a quantity of adjoining land in section 36 of the cadastral unit of the Hundred of Sleaford.  It shares boundaries with the Lincoln National Park on its north and east sides along with a parcel of land to its immediate west.

The land under protection was originally established as the Sleaford Mere National Park on 20 November 1969  under the National Parks Act 1966. On 27 April 1972, the national park was reconstituted as the Sleaford Mere Conservation Park under the National Parks and Wildlife Act 1972.

The following statement of significance was published in 1980:
Sleaford Mere Conservation Park preserves a picturesque saline lake, which provides feeding habitat for a number of waterbird species, including chestnut teal which are known to breed in the park.  Marine fish, including a large, land-locked population of skates are found in the Lake. 

The conservation park is classified as an IUCN Category III protected area. In 1980, it was listed on the now-defunct Register of the National Estate.

See also
 Protected areas of South Australia

References

External links
Sleaford Mere Conservation Park webpage on protected planet

Conservation parks of South Australia
Protected areas established in 1969
1969 establishments in Australia
Eyre Peninsula
South Australian places listed on the defunct Register of the National Estate